Stanislav Savchenko (born 21 January 1967) is a Ukrainian chess grandmaster (1993). He took part in the FIDE World Chess Championship 2002, but was knocked out in the first round by Francisco Vallejo Pons.

He played for Ukraine in the Chess Olympiads of 1996 and 1998. In 1997 he tied for first through third place with Giorgi Bagaturov and Alexander Moroz in the Danko Chess Tournament in Yenakiieve. In 2006 he tied for first with Boris Chatalbashev in the 4th Georgiev-Kesarovski tournament. In 2007 he tied for first with Sergey Fedorchuk in Bad Zwesten Open.

On the May 2010 FIDE list his Elo rating is 2553.

References

External links

1967 births
Living people
Chess grandmasters
Ukrainian chess players